LaVerne Butler is an American jazz singer.

Butler was born in Shreveport, Louisiana, the daughter of saxophonist Scott Butler, and was exposed to jazz and rhythm and blues music. She attended the University of New Orleans. She worked in local clubs as a singer, including with New Orleans jazz veterans Ellis Marsalis and Alvin Batiste. She moved to New York City and worked as an English teacher while singing in clubs. She studied with another jazz veteran, singer Jon Hendricks. In the 1990s she recorded two albums for Chesky Records.

Critical reception
She released two albums on Chesky Records to critical approval from 1992–1994.

Discography
 No Looking Back (Chesky, 1992)
 Day Dreamin'  (Chesky, 1994)
 Blues in the City (Maxjazz, 1999)
 A Foolish Thing to Do (Maxjazz, 2001)
 Love Lost and Found Again (HighNote, 2012)

References

Living people
American women jazz singers
American jazz singers
Chesky Records artists
HighNote Records artists
Year of birth missing (living people)
21st-century American women